Penicillium flavidostipitatum is a species of the genus of Penicillium which produces patulin.

See also
 List of Penicillium species

References

flavidostipitatum
Fungi described in 1984